Black Horse Lake is a seasonal lake just north of present-day Great Falls, Montana. The lake is usually dry, except during the spring and early summer.

Location 
Black horse Lake is located approximately 3 miles southeast of Benton Lake National Wildlife Refuge.

History

This lake was previously a large, year round lake. According to historical records, the nearby Benton Lake, was used by early European settlers in the Great Falls, Montana region, to irrigate farms. A canal or canals were dug to drain Benton Lake for irrigation. The one remaining canal leads from northwest to southeast, directly to Black Horse Lake. The canal abruptly stops about a third of a mile from where Black Horse Lake was situated.

In 2008 the United States Department of Energy obliged Montana Alberta Tie Ltd to route power-lines away from the lake.

Ecology 
The lake is an alkali wetlands and a habitat to waterfowl, gulls and shorebirds. It floods seasonally.

Size
The present size of Black Horse Lake varies due to varying precipitation and other factors. In dry years, the lake never fills up at all. The lakes maximum extent is 1.5 miles from north to south, and 1.25 miles from east to west covering an area of

See also
 Chippewa Indians of Montana

References

External links
 Black Horse Lake listing at Wikimapia
 Black Horse Lake, Montana (archive) Lake Locate
 

Great Falls, Montana
Lakes of Montana
Bodies of water of Cascade County, Montana
Wetlands of Montana